Touty Gandega (born June 20, 1991) is a French-Malian women's basketball player for Angers Basket 49. Touty is the Sister of Diana Gandega who also plays basketball.

References

External links

1991 births
Living people
Basketball players from Paris
French women's basketball players
Malian women's basketball players
French sportspeople of Malian descent
Power forwards (basketball)